The Sylamore Creek Bridge is a historic bridge in east central Stone County, Arkansas, just south of the Ozark-St. Francis National Forest. It carries County Road 283 across Sylamore Creek, a short way west of Arkansas Highway 9 and north of the Holiday Mountain Resort in Allison. It is a wire-cable suspension bridge, with steel towers mounted on concrete piers supporting four main cables that are anchored into concrete abutments. Built in 1945, it is one of three known wire-cable bridges in the state.

The bridge was listed on the National Register of Historic Places in 1999.

See also
National Register of Historic Places listings in Stone County, Arkansas
List of bridges on the National Register of Historic Places in Arkansas

References

Road bridges on the National Register of Historic Places in Arkansas
Bridges completed in 1945
National Register of Historic Places in Stone County, Arkansas
Steel bridges in the United States
Suspension bridges in the United States
Transportation in Stone County, Arkansas
1945 in Arkansas